Novopetrovka is a rural locality (a selo) in Oktyabrsky Selsoviet, Kulundinsky District, Altai Krai, Russia. The population was 378 as of 2013. There are 3 streets.

Geography 
Novopetrovka is located 7 km southwest of Kulunda (the district's administrative centre) by road. Kulunda is the nearest rural locality.

References 

Rural localities in Kulundinsky District